Pup Rock is a rock about  in diameter, between Refuge Islands and Tiber Rocks in Rymill Bay, off the west coast of the Antarctic Peninsula. It was discovered by geologist Robert L. Nichols of the Ronne Antarctic Research Expedition (RARE) of 1947–48, who called it "Three Pup Island". The name was later shortened.

References

Rock formations of Graham Land
Fallières Coast